Fort Chadbourne was a fort established by the United States Army on October 28, 1852, in what is now Coke County, Texas, to protect the western frontier and the Butterfield Overland Mail route.  It was named after Lt. T.L. Chadbourne, who was killed in the Battle of Resaca de la Palma. It was defended by Companies A and K of the 8th U.S. Infantry.  During the early days of the American Civil War, the fort surrendered to the Confederates on February 28, 1861, even before the Confederate shelling of Fort Sumter, South Carolina, but was reoccupied by federal troops from 1865 to 1867.

Other forts in the frontier fort system were Forts Griffin, Concho, Belknap, Richardson, Stockton, Davis, Bliss, Mason, McKavett, Clark, McIntosh, Inge, and Phantom Hill in Texas, and Fort Sill in Oklahoma.  "Subposts or intermediate stations" also were used, including Bothwick's Station on Salt Creek between Fort Richardson and Fort Belknap, Camp Wichita near Buffalo Springs between Fort Richardson and Red River Station, and Mountain Pass between Fort Concho and Fort Griffin.

Major Neighbors
Robert Neighbors met with the southern band of Comanches and their chiefs Sanaco, Buffalo Hump, Ketsume, and Yellow Wolf near the fort over 10 days starting on 24 August 1853.  "All topics of interest to the Comanches were discussed".
Neighbors communicated with Seth Eastman, while Seth was a captain at the fort in 1856 and was responsible for the Brazos Indian Reservation, about Comanche depredations in the area.

Preservation
Fort Chadbourne, a Texas state historical site, was also added in 1973 to the National Register of Historic Places (#73001962).
The small community of Fort Chadbourne, Texas, is located a few miles to the southwest of the original fort.

Fort Chadbourne has received $1 million to build a visitor's center in memory of Roberta Cole Johnson of Brenham, Texas, by the executors of her estate, Charles and Joy Blake. The Blakes are members of the Concho Valley Archaeological Society in San Angelo. They also matched another $125,000-allocation to restore the Butterfield stage stop.

On September 20, 2009, Garland H. Richards, current owner of the Chadbourne Ranch, which covers parts of Coke, Runnels, Taylor, and Nolan Counties, was presented with the prestigious Harry Holt Award because of  Richards' assistance to the West Texas Rehabilitation Center in Abilene. Richards presided over the annual "Round-Up for Rehab Supper" fund-raiser held at Fort Chadbourne. The award was presented by Woody Gilliland, chief executive officer of the rehab center. It honors those in the agricultural community who support the mission of the center, which serves adults and children regardless of financial circumstance.

Texas State Senator Grady Hazlewood, father  of the farm-to-market road program, was born at Old Fort Chadbourne in 1902.

See also

Texas Forts Trail
Forts of Texas

References

External links 

Fort Chadbourne
Official Web Site

Buildings and structures in Coke County, Texas
Chadbourne
Butterfield Overland Mail in Texas
Chadbourne
Texas in the American Civil War
Chadbourne
1852 establishments in Texas
Museums in Coke County, Texas
Historic districts on the National Register of Historic Places in Texas
National Register of Historic Places in Coke County, Texas
Stagecoach stops in the United States